Al-Hofuf   (also spelled Hofuf or Hufuf, also known as "Al-Hasa", "Al-Ahsa" or "Al-Hassa") is the major urban city in the Al-Ahsa Oasis in the Eastern Province of Saudi Arabia, with a population of  858,395 (as of 2021). It is also known for being one of the largest date producers in the world, and for its old souks and palaces.

Overview 
The city proper has a population of 150,000 and is part of a larger populated oasis area of towns and villages of around 600,000. It is located inland, southwest of Abqaiq and the Dhahran–Dammam–Al-Khobar metropolitan area on the road south to Haradh.  It is the closest city to the famous Ghawar oil field, one of the world's largest conventional (land-based) fields. Hofuf is one of the major cultural centers in Saudi Arabia. A lot of well-known families live there.  The faculties of agriculture, veterinary medicine and animal resources for King Faisal University are located in the city (the others being in Dammam).  The Hofuf campus also has facilities where Saudi women can study medicine, dentistry and home economics.

Legend places Hofuf as the burial place of Laila and Majnoon, the star-crossed pair of the most popular love story in the Arab and Muslim world. The Queen of Sheba is also fabled to have visited this city from her kingdom in Yemen. German explorer, Hermann Burchardt, photographed the city in 1904.

Economy 
Historically, Hofuf made textiles out of wool, silk, and cotton. The town was also renowned for its fruit of the date palm, the Arabs considering the khalasi variety of dates, locally grown in Hofuf, and also the fardh variety of Oman, among the best. As of 1920, the city was known for making coffee pots from silver and brass.

Climate 
Al Hofuf has a hot desert climate (Köppen climate classification BWh) with long, very hot summers and mild, short winters.

Culture 
The International Random Film Festival was going to be hosted in Hofuf in January 2015, but it was replaced by Helsinki, Finland in May 2017.

Transportation

Airport 
The city is served by King Fahd International Airport which is 160 km away in Dammam, despite the fact that the city has two airports of its own.

The local airport, Al-Ahsa International Airport, is being used for domestic and limited international flights to Dubai. While the other is an old airstrip which is now abandoned.

Railway 
The city has a railway station connecting the city with the capital Riyadh to the west and Dammam to the north. All railways in Saudi Arabia are organized by the Saudi Railways Organization.

Notable people
 Samira Islam, pharmacologist and scholar

References

External links 
 Hofuf on www.The-Saudi.net
 Jabal Qarah, Splendid Arabia: A travel site with photos and routes

Populated places in Eastern Province, Saudi Arabia